The Coniophoraceae are a family of fungi in the Boletales order. The family contains 6 genera and 28 species.

References

 
Basidiomycota families